1,4-Dicyanobenzene is an organic compound with the formula C6H4(CN)2.  Two other isomers exist, phthalonitrile and isophthalonitrile.  All three isomers are produced commercially by ammoxidation of the corresponding xylene isomers.  1,4-Dicyanobenzene is a colorless or white solid with low solubility in water. Hydrogenation of isophthalonitrile affords p-xylylenediamine.

1,4-dicyanobenzene is electrochemically active, forming a stable persistent radical at anodes.  For this reason, it has been used as a catalyst for automated reaction discovery, testing whether other species are redox active.

Safety
The  (rat, oral) is 6400 mg/kg.

References

Benzonitriles